In mathematics, a Hopf algebra, named after Heinz Hopf, is a structure that is simultaneously an (unital associative) algebra and a (counital coassociative) coalgebra, with these structures' compatibility making it a bialgebra, and that moreover is equipped with an antiautomorphism satisfying a certain property. The representation theory of a Hopf algebra is particularly nice, since the existence of compatible comultiplication, counit, and antipode allows for the construction of tensor products of representations, trivial representations, and dual representations.

Hopf algebras occur naturally in algebraic topology, where they originated and are related to the H-space concept, in group scheme theory, in group theory (via the concept of a group ring), and in numerous other places, making them probably the most familiar type of bialgebra. Hopf algebras are also studied in their own right, with much work on specific classes of examples on the one hand and classification problems on the other. They have diverse applications ranging from condensed-matter physics and quantum field theory to string theory and LHC phenomenology.

Formal definition
Formally, a Hopf algebra is an (associative and coassociative) bialgebra H over a field K together with a K-linear map S: H → H (called the antipode) such that the following diagram commutes:

Here Δ is the comultiplication of the bialgebra, ∇ its multiplication, η its unit and ε its counit. In the sumless Sweedler notation, this property can also be expressed as

As for algebras, one can replace the underlying field K with a commutative ring R in the above definition.

The definition of Hopf algebra is self-dual (as reflected in the symmetry of the above diagram), so if one can define a dual of H (which is always possible if H is finite-dimensional), then it is automatically a Hopf algebra.

Structure constants 
Fixing a basis  for the underlying vector space, one may define the algebra in terms of structure constants for multiplication:

for co-multiplication:

and the antipode:

Associativity then requires that

while co-associativity requires that

The connecting axiom requires that

Properties of the antipode
The antipode S is sometimes required to have a K-linear inverse, which is automatic in the finite-dimensional case, or if H is commutative or cocommutative (or more generally quasitriangular).

In general, S is an antihomomorphism, so S2 is a homomorphism, which is therefore an automorphism if S was invertible (as may be required).

If S2 = idH, then the Hopf algebra is said to be involutive (and the underlying algebra with involution is a *-algebra). If H is finite-dimensional semisimple over a field of characteristic zero, commutative, or cocommutative, then it is involutive.

If a bialgebra B admits an antipode S, then S is unique ("a bialgebra admits at most 1 Hopf algebra structure"). Thus, the antipode does not pose any extra structure which we can choose: Being a Hopf algebra is a property of a bialgebra.

The antipode is an analog to the inversion map on a group that sends g to g−1.

Hopf subalgebras
A subalgebra A of a Hopf algebra H is a Hopf subalgebra if it is a subcoalgebra of H and the antipode S maps A into A. In other words, a Hopf subalgebra A is a Hopf algebra in its own right when the multiplication, comultiplication, counit and antipode of H are restricted to A (and additionally the identity 1 of H is  required to be in A). The Nichols–Zoeller freeness theorem  established (in 1989) that the natural A-module H is free of finite rank if H is finite-dimensional: a generalization of Lagrange's theorem for subgroups. As a corollary of this and integral theory, a Hopf subalgebra of a semisimple finite-dimensional Hopf algebra is automatically semisimple.

A Hopf subalgebra A is said to be right normal in a Hopf algebra H if it satisfies the condition of stability, adr(h)(A) ⊆ A for all h in H, where the right adjoint mapping adr is defined by adr(h)(a) = S(h(1))ah(2) for all a in A, h in H. Similarly, a Hopf subalgebra A is left normal in H if it is stable under the left adjoint mapping defined by adl(h)(a) = h(1)aS(h(2)). The two conditions of normality are equivalent if the antipode S is bijective, in which case A is said to be a normal Hopf subalgebra.

A normal Hopf subalgebra A in H satisfies the condition (of equality of subsets of H): HA+ = A+H where A+ denotes the kernel of the counit on A. This normality condition implies that HA+ is a Hopf ideal of H (i.e. an algebra ideal in the kernel of the counit, a coalgebra coideal and stable under the antipode). As a consequence one has a quotient Hopf algebra H/HA+ and epimorphism H → H/A+H, a theory analogous to that of normal subgroups and quotient groups in group theory.

Hopf orders
A Hopf order O over an integral domain R with field of fractions K is an order in a Hopf algebra H over K which is closed under the algebra and coalgebra operations: in particular, the comultiplication Δ maps O to O⊗O.

Group-like elements
A group-like element is a nonzero element x such that Δ(x) = x⊗x. The group-like elements form a group with inverse given by the antipode. A primitive element x satisfies Δ(x) = x⊗1 + 1⊗x.

Examples 

Note that functions on a finite group can be identified with the group ring, though these are more naturally thought of as dual – the group ring consists of finite sums of elements, and thus pairs with functions on the group by evaluating the function on the summed elements.

Cohomology of Lie groups 
The cohomology algebra (over a field ) of a Lie group  is a Hopf algebra: the multiplication is provided by the cup product, and the comultiplication 

by the group multiplication . This observation was actually a source of the notion of Hopf algebra. Using this structure, Hopf proved a structure theorem for the cohomology algebra of Lie groups.

Theorem (Hopf) Let  be a finite-dimensional, graded commutative, graded cocommutative Hopf algebra over a field of characteristic 0. Then  (as an algebra) is a free exterior algebra with generators of odd degree.

Quantum groups and non-commutative geometry 

All examples above are either commutative (i.e. the multiplication is commutative) or co-commutative (i.e. Δ = T ∘ Δ where the twist map T: H ⊗ H → H ⊗ H is defined by T(x ⊗ y) = y ⊗ x). Other interesting Hopf algebras are certain "deformations" or "quantizations" of those from example 3 which are neither commutative nor co-commutative. These Hopf algebras are often called quantum groups, a term that is so far only loosely defined. They are important in noncommutative geometry, the idea being the following: a standard algebraic group is well described by its standard Hopf algebra of regular functions; we can then think of the deformed version of this Hopf algebra as describing a certain "non-standard" or "quantized" algebraic group (which is not an algebraic group at all). While there does not seem to be a direct way to define or manipulate these non-standard objects, one can still work with their Hopf algebras, and indeed one identifies them with their Hopf algebras. Hence the name "quantum group".

Representation theory
Let A be a Hopf algebra, and let M and N be A-modules. Then, M ⊗ N is also an A-module, with

for m ∈ M, n ∈ N and Δ(a) = (a1, a2). Furthermore, we can define the trivial representation as the base field K with

for m ∈ K. Finally, the dual representation of A can be defined: if M is an A-module and M* is its dual space, then

where f ∈ M* and m ∈ M.

The relationship between Δ, ε, and S ensure that certain natural homomorphisms of vector spaces are indeed homomorphisms of A-modules. For instance, the natural isomorphisms of vector spaces M → M ⊗ K and M → K ⊗ M are also isomorphisms of A-modules. Also, the map of vector spaces M* ⊗ M → K with f ⊗ m → f(m) is also a homomorphism of A-modules. However, the map M ⊗ M* → K is not necessarily a homomorphism of A-modules.

Related concepts 
Graded Hopf algebras are often used in algebraic topology: they are the natural algebraic structure on the direct sum of all homology or cohomology groups of an H-space.

Locally compact quantum groups generalize Hopf algebras and carry a topology. The algebra of all continuous functions on a Lie group is a locally compact quantum group.

Quasi-Hopf algebras are generalizations of Hopf algebras, where coassociativity only holds up to a twist. They have been used in the study of the Knizhnik–Zamolodchikov equations.

Multiplier Hopf algebras introduced by Alfons Van Daele in 1994 are generalizations of Hopf algebras where comultiplication from an algebra (with or without unit) to the multiplier algebra of tensor product algebra of the algebra with itself.

Hopf group-(co)algebras introduced by V. G. Turaev in 2000 are also generalizations of Hopf algebras.

Weak Hopf algebras
Weak Hopf algebras, or quantum groupoids, are  generalizations of Hopf algebras. Like Hopf algebras, weak Hopf algebras form a self-dual class of algebras; i.e., if H is a (weak) Hopf algebra, so is H*, the dual space of linear forms on H (with respect to the algebra-coalgebra structure obtained from  the natural pairing with H and its coalgebra-algebra structure). A weak Hopf algebra H is usually taken to be a
finite-dimensional algebra and coalgebra with coproduct Δ: H → H ⊗ H  and counit ε: H → k satisfying all the axioms of Hopf algebra except possibly Δ(1) ≠ 1 ⊗ 1 or ε(ab) ≠ ε(a)ε(b) for some a,b in H. Instead one requires the following:

for all a, b, and c in H.
 H has a weakened antipode S: H → H satisfying the axioms:

 for all a in H (the right-hand side is the interesting projection usually denoted by ΠR(a) or εs(a) with image a separable subalgebra denoted by HR or Hs); 
 for all a in H (another interesting projection usually denoted by ΠR(a) or εt(a) with image a separable algebra HL or Ht, anti-isomorphic to HL via S);
 for all a in H.

Note that if Δ(1) = 1 ⊗ 1, these conditions reduce to the two usual conditions on the antipode of a Hopf algebra.

The axioms are partly chosen so that the category of H-modules is a rigid monoidal category. The unit H-module is the separable algebra HL mentioned above. 
 
For example, a finite groupoid algebra is a weak Hopf algebra. In particular, the groupoid algebra on [n] with one pair of invertible arrows eij and eji  between i and j in [n] is isomorphic to the algebra H of n x n matrices. The weak Hopf algebra structure on this particular H is given by coproduct Δ(eij) = eij ⊗ eij, counit ε(eij) = 1 and antipode S(eij) = eji. The separable subalgebras HL and HR coincide and are non-central commutative algebras in this particular case (the subalgebra of diagonal matrices).

Early theoretical contributions to weak Hopf algebras are to be found in as well as

Hopf algebroids
See Hopf algebroid

Analogy with groups
Groups can be axiomatized by the same diagrams (equivalently, operations) as a Hopf algebra, where G is taken to be a set instead of a module. In this case:
 the field K is replaced by the 1-point set
 there is a natural counit (map to 1 point)
 there is a natural comultiplication (the diagonal map)
 the unit is the identity element of the group
 the multiplication is the multiplication in the group
 the antipode is the inverse
In this philosophy, a group can be thought of as a Hopf algebra over the "field with one element".

Hopf algebras in braided monoidal categories 
The definition of Hopf algebra is naturally extended to arbitrary braided monoidal categories.

  (multiplication),

  (unit),

  (comultiplication),

  (counit),

  (antipode)

— are morphisms in  such that

1) the triple  is a monoid in the monoidal category , i.e. the following diagrams are commutative:

2) the triple  is a comonoid in the monoidal category , i.e. the following diagrams are commutative:

 
 

The quintuple  with the properties 1),2),3) is called a bialgebra in the category ;

4) the diagram of antipode is commutative:

The typical examples are the following.

 Groups. At the same time, a triple  is a comonoid in the categorical sense iff  is the diagonal operation  (and the operation  is defined uniquely as well). And any such a structure of comonoid  is compatible with any structure of monoid  in the sense that the diagrams in the section 3 of the definition always commute. The existence of the antipode  for such a bialgebra  means exactly that every element  has an inverse element  with respect to the multiplication . Thus, in the category of sets  Hopf algebras are exactly groups in the usual algebraic sense.
 Classical Hopf algebras.
 Functional algebras on groups.
 Group algebras. These Hopf algebras are used in the duality theories for non-commutative groups.

See also 
 Quasitriangular Hopf algebra
 Algebra/set analogy
 Representation theory of Hopf algebras
 Ribbon Hopf algebra
 Superalgebra
 Supergroup
 Anyonic Lie algebra
 Sweedler's Hopf algebra
 Hopf algebra of permutations
 Milnor–Moore theorem

Notes and references

Notes

References 
 .
 
 
 Heinz Hopf, Uber die Topologie der Gruppen-Mannigfaltigkeiten und ihrer Verallgemeinerungen, Annals of Mathematics 42 (1941), 22–52. Reprinted in Selecta Heinz Hopf, pp. 119–151, Springer, Berlin (1964). , 
 
 .

 
 .

 
Monoidal categories
Representation theory